Major General Sir Francis James Cecil Bowes-Lyon,  (19 September 1917 – 18 December 1977) was a senior British Army officer who served as commandant of the British Sector in Berlin from 1968 to 1970.

Early life and education
Bowes-Lyon was born in Chelsea, London, the son of Capt. Geoffrey Francis Bowes-Lyon, grandson of 13th Earl and Countess of Strathmore and Kinghorne. He was thus a first cousin of Queen Elizabeth The Queen Mother. His mother was Edith Katherine Selby-Bigge, daughter of Sir Amherst Selby-Bigge, 1st Baronet. He was educated at Eton College and Sandhurst.

Military career
Bowes-Lyon was commissioned into the Grenadier Guards in 1938, and served in the Guards Armoured Division during the Second World War.

In 1955 he became commandant at the Guards Depot and in 1957 he was made commanding officer of 2nd Battalion Grenadier Guards. He was appointed Military Assistant to Field Marshal Sir Francis Festing, the Chief of the Imperial General Staff, in 1960 and Commander of 157th Lowland Brigade in 1963.

He went on to be General Officer Commanding 52nd Lowland Division District in 1966 and commandant of the British Sector in Berlin in 1968. In 1971 he was appointed Major-General commanding the Household Division and General Officer Commanding London District. He retired in 1973.

Personal life
Bowes-Lyon married Mary de Trafford, daughter of Sir Humphrey de Trafford, 4th Baronet. The couple had three children, two sons, John (died 18 September 2022) and David, and a daughter, Fiona. The family lived at Sennicotts in West Sussex.  

A descendant of the 13th Earl of Strathmore, he was a Gentleman Usher to the Royal Household.

References
 

|-
 

|-
 

1917 births
1977 deaths
Military personnel from London
Knights Commander of the Royal Victorian Order
Companions of the Order of the Bath
Officers of the Order of the British Empire
Recipients of the Military Cross
British Army major generals
Grenadier Guards officers
British Army personnel of World War II
Graduates of the Royal Military College, Sandhurst
People educated at Eton College
People from Chelsea, London